The Champion and Pearson Funeral Home is a historic commercial building at 1325 Park Street in Columbia, South Carolina.  Built in 1929, it is an architecturally eclectic landmark in an area that was traditionally a center of African-American economic activity in the city.   It was built by the Pearson family to serve as a funeral parlor and residence for the family, during the height of the Jim Crow era.  The property was used as a funeral home until 1966.

The building was added to the National Register of Historic Places in 2017.

See also
National Register of Historic Places listings in Columbia, South Carolina

References

Commercial buildings on the National Register of Historic Places in South Carolina
Commercial buildings completed in 1929
Buildings and structures in Columbia, South Carolina
National Register of Historic Places in Columbia, South Carolina